Charisse Arrington is an R&B singer who was signed to MCA Records in the 1990s. Her biggest success was with the single "Down With This" which peaked in the top twenty of the Billboard Dance singles chart and top five of the Billboard Dance breakout chart. Her last charting single "Ain't No Way" was released in 1997, it peaked at number ninety-two on the Billboard R&B singles chart.

Discography
Albums
The House That I Built (1996) (Unreleased) (MCA Records) 
Singles

References

American contemporary R&B singers
Living people
Year of birth missing (living people)